John Friend may refer to:

John Albert Newton Friend (1881–1966), British chemist 
John Friend (conspirator) (died 1696), English conspirator
John Friend (footballer) (born 1953), Australian rules footballer 
John Friend (yogi), founder of Anusara Yoga
 John Friend Ltd, a New Zealand law publisher, presently known as Thomson Reuters New Zealand Limited, part of Thomson Reuters
The Infamous John Friend, 1909 novel and 1959 BBC television miniseries

See also
 John Freind (disambiguation)